In mathematics, a stuck unknot is a closed polygonal chain that is topologically equal to the unknot but cannot be deformed to a simple polygon by rigid motions of the segments.
Similarly a stuck open chain is an open polygonal chain such that the segments may not be aligned by moving rigidly its segments. Topologically such a chain can be unknotted, but the limitation of using only rigid motions of the segments can create nontrivial knots in such a chain.

Consideration of such "stuck" configurations arises in the study of molecular chains in biochemistry.

References

Knots (knot theory)